Elena A. Reid (born November 1, 1981) is an American former boxer and former mixed martial artist. She is a former WIBA and IFBA Flyweight Champion and fights under the nickname Baby Doll.

Early life
Reid was born in Phoenix, Arizona in 1981. Reid attended St. Mary's High School (Phoenix, Arizona) and
played on an all-boys youth soccer team when she was a young girl. Reid participated in Karate and Boxing, and won an Arizona State Kickboxing Title at age 17.

Boxing career
Making her professional boxing debut on April 18, 2000, in Phoenix, Elena "Baby Doll" Reid defeated Jo Ellen Caldwell by a four-round decision.  Her first career win was followed shortly thereafter by her first career defeat, when she was beaten by Layla McCarter in a four-round unanimous decision.  McCarter, who had improved her own record to 3 wins, 4 losses and 1 draw with her victory, went on to become the youngest boxer ever to win an IFBA World Title on October 7, 2000.  Reid got her first career knockout win on August 26, 2000, by defeating Jessica Elgin Combs in the first round of their fight at the Mandalay Bay Resort and Casino in Las Vegas, Nevada.

On September 11, 2004 at DM Arena in Karlsruhe, Germany, Elena Reid fought her first title fight when she took on local favorite and German media darling Regina Halmich, for Halmich's WIBF Flyweight Title.  Over 10 rounds the match was a draw, and Halmich remained the title holder. The outcome left Reid with a 14-1-5 (4 KO) record, while moving Halmich to 45-1-1 (15 KOs).

After four more fights, Elena Reid received a rematch against Halmich.  On December 3, 2005 the two engaged in  another closely contested bout in Germany, for the WIBF Flyweight Title.  This time, the judges scored the 10-round fight all for Regina Halmich.

On August 31, 2006 Reid won the vacant WIBA Flyweight title by defeating Mary "The Heat" Ortega in a ten-round unanimous decision at Harveys Lake Tahoe Casino & Resort, in Stateline, NV. Reid improved her record to (18-3-5), while Ortega fell to (28-3-1).

As of 2007, Elena Reid was trained by Chris Ben and lived and trained in Las Vegas, Nevada. When not training, she was a student at UNLV majoring in marketing.

On July 2, 2007, Reid won the IFBA World Flyweight Championship by defeating Shin Hi Choi.

Reid faced France's Nadya Hokmi on June 5, 2010 for the vacant WBF Women's Super Flyweight Championship. Reid lost the fight by unanimous decision. Reid wore a knee brace during the fight due to injuries suffered prior to an April 2010 mixed martial arts bout.

Mixed martial arts career
On December 28, 2007, Reid made her professional MMA debut against Tammie Schneider and won the fight by TKO in the second round.

She faced Stephanie Palmer at SuperFights MMA - Night of Combat on October 11, 2008. She won the fight by TKO in the first round.

She faced Michelle Waterson at Apache Gold: Extreme Beatdown on April 11, 2009. Reid won the fight by TKO in the second round.

On October 24, 2009, Reid faced Masako Yoshida for the Sovereign Nations MMA Women's Flyweight Championship at EB - Beatdown at 4 Bears 5 in New Town, North Dakota. She defeated Yoshida by TKO when the referee stopped the fight in the third round after a series of unanswered punches.

Reid was set to defend her SNMMA title for the first time at Playboy Fight Night 4 on April 17, 2010 against Alyx Luck. The fight was canceled after Luck falsified pre-fight bloodwork and was subsequently suspended. Reid faced Catia Vitoria instead and was defeated by TKO in the third round, losing the SNMMA title in the process.

In June 2010  Reid suffered a torn MCL and ruptured ACL in her left knee prior to the fight with Vitoria. As a result, Reid was forced to withdraw from the Bellator 115-pound women's tournament.

Retirement from combat sports
In an interview on April 15, 2011, Reid confirmed that she had chosen not to have surgery on her injured knee and would be retiring from MMA and boxing.

In 2016, Reid was inducted into the International Women's Boxing Hall of Fame.

Personal life
Reid is of Filipino descent.

Reid was set to marry fellow MMA fighter Ray Steinbeiss on October 29, 2011.

Outside of fighting, Reid is involved with the Community Future Generation Project (FGP), a non-profit organization in Phoenix, Arizona, and also teaches fitness classes for children in the area.

Professional boxing record

Mixed martial arts record

|-
| Loss
|align=center| 4-1
|  Catia Vitoria
| TKO (punches)
| Playboy Fight Night 4
| 
|align=center| 3
|align=center| 3:59
|New Town, North Dakota, United States
| Lost Sovereign Nations MMA Women's Flyweight Championship
|-
| Win
|align=center| 4-0
|  Masako Yoshida
| TKO (punches)
| EB - Beatdown at 4 Bears 5
| 
|align=center| 3
|align=center| 2:35
|New Town, North Dakota, United States
| Won Sovereign Nations MMA Women's Flyweight Championship
|-
| Win
|align=center| 3-0
|  Michelle Waterson
| TKO (punches)
| Apache Gold: Extreme Beatdown
| 
|align=center| 2
|align=center| 1:50
|Phoenix, Arizona, United States
|
|-
| Win
|align=center| 2-0
|  Stephanie Palmer
| TKO (liver punch)
| SuperFights MMA - Night of Combat 2
| 
|align=center| 1
|align=center| 0:53
|Las Vegas, Nevada, United States
|
|-
| Win
|align=center| 1-0
|  Tammie Schneider
| TKO (punches)
| IFO - Fireworks in the Cage IV
| 
|align=center| 2
|align=center| 2:05
|Las Vegas, Nevada, United States
|

Championships
 Former Sovereign Nations MMA Women's Flyweight Champion
 Former WIBA Flyweight Champion
 Former IFBA Flyweight Champion

References

External links
 Elena Reid Awakening Profile
 Biography from Women's Boxing Archive Network
 
 Womens International Boxing Federation
 International Female Boxers Association
 

1981 births
Living people
American female mixed martial artists
Mixed martial artists utilizing boxing
Mixed martial artists utilizing karate
American sportspeople of Filipino descent
American women boxers
Sportspeople from Phoenix, Arizona
Flyweight boxers
World boxing champions
American female karateka
21st-century American women